Rossetti's Compass is a synthpop and EBM music band created in November 2010 by the British musician Mark Warner. It was conceived from a desire to explore different directions in the electro musical sphere, from pure synthpop to dark and menacing electro and EBM. In 2013, the band released three albums, including a limited edition semi-live recording session. True to its self-imposed remit of exploration, the Rossetti's Compass catalogue of works includes track remixes for bands from across the genre, including A.W.o.L. Angst Pop, Kant Kino, HNN, Technomancer, Shatoo, Attrition, and Naked Lunch.

Formation and Evolution 
Rossetti's Compass was conceived by Mark Warner during a 2010 visit to Berlin where he was working with Oppenheimer Analysis members Andy Oppenheimer and Martin Lloyd (now deceased). At the time an active member of the Minimal Wave band Sudeten Creche, Warner was keen to explore the wider EBM sphere, and his early Rossetti's Compass compositions were used as set fillers by Sudeten Creche on their short European tour in April 2011.

After Warner split from Sudeten Creche in late 2012, Rossetti's Compass began to grow. A successful collaboration on the first Rossetti's Compass EP, Tear Garden, released in March 2013, led to the synthpop master and former member of Apoptygma Berzerk, Per Aksel Lundgreen, joined Rossetti's Compass as a permanent member.

A second EP, My Beloved, was released in August 2013. Like Tear Garden, it was mastered by Martin Bowes, a long-time friend of Lundgreen and a member of the British dark industrial music act Attrition. This second EP release coincided with Bowes joining the band as its third member, completing the current Rossetti's Compass line-up.

In November 2013, the band recorded a third, semi-live album entitled Cage Sessions 01, which included guest vocals by Bowes' Engram partner John Costello. The Cage Sessions are a Martin Bowes innovation inspired by the old John Peel band sessions, where musicians spend one day in the studio recording several tracks, and are interviewed at the same time. It is a chance for them to do something a little different. Profits from this release were donated by Rossetti's Compass to Cancer Research.

Recording work has started on a full album by Rossetti's Compass, with its release anticipated in early 2014, to coincide with a series of live gigs, the first in the band's history.

Name 
The name Rossetti's Compass encapsulates the idea of freedom of musical exploration that is the cornerstone of the band's ethos. While it expresses the concept of direction, this is driven from the heart by passion, thus casting aside the constraints of conformity.

Musical style 
The defining sound of Rossetti's Compass lies among the distinctive multilayered textures of synthpop, and the hard, minimal, rhythmic beat of electronic body music (EBM), and everywhere in between. At the EBM end of the spectrum the sound could stylistically be labelled as "dirty pop" or "future pop".

Clearly illustrating the diversity of the Rossetti's Compass range, the first EP, Tear Garden, was described as "covering almost every phase of electro music".

A diverse array of musical influences is behind the Rossetti's Compass sound, reflecting the exploratory nature of its music. Key influences include electro bands from across the genre, such as Kraftwerk, Cabaret Voltaire, Throbbing Gristle, Click Click, The Klinik, A Split-Second, hard CORPS, Test Dept and Portion Control. Additional strains of punk derive from the likes of D.A.F., Sex Pistols, The Clash and early Siouxsie and the Banshees, with new wave influences coming from bands such as The Human League, The B-52's, Tuxedomoon and Devo. Further rock and synthpop influences are found in the form of Yazoo, Bowie, Roxy Music, The Velvet Underground, The Legendary Pink Dots, Leather Nun and Joy Division.

Members and musical pedigree

Mark Warner 
Vocals, synth and guitar, programming 
 1978 to 1980 - The Firm
 1982, and 2006 to 2012 - Sudeten Creche
 1983 – 1985 - The Virgin Brides
 1987 to 1988 - World Gone Mad
 1992 to 1993 - Miles from Luton
 1993 to 1997 - Tokyo Rose
 1994 to 1996 - Three fiddlers Not
 2010 to present - Rossetti's Compass
 2010 to present - Touching the Void
 2010 to present - Entscheidungs Maschine
 2016 to present - Naked Lunch

Per Aksel Lundgreen 
Percussion and synth backing vocals, producer
 1989 to present - Angst Pop
 1990 to 1994 - Apoptygma Berzerk
 1995 to present - Cronos Titan
 1995 to present - Chinese Detectives
 2013 to present - Rossetti's Compass
 2013 to present - Shatoo

Martin Bowes 
Synth backing vocals, sound engineering, mastering

 1980 to present - Attrition 
 1996 to present - Engram 
 2013 to present - Rossetti's Compass

John Costello 
Synth, backing vocals
 1980 to 2016 - John Costello
 1996 to present - Engram 
 2016 to present - Rossetti's Compass

Discography 
 EP - Tear Garden (2013) - No Emb Blanc, catalogue No. NEB012
 EP - My Beloved (2013) - Sub Culture Records, catalogue No. SUBCULTURE012
 The Cage Sessions 01 (2013) - Two Gods, catalogue No. TGCS01
 EP - Attrition (2015) - Sub Culture Records, catalogue No. SUBCULTURE195
 Single - Shivering Skin (2016) - LJE Music, catalogue No. LJEM D007

References

External links
 Official website

British electronic body music groups
English synth-pop groups
Musical groups established in 2010
2010 establishments in England